Whiskey Myers is the fifth album of the American country music band Whiskey Myers. It was released on September 27, 2019 via Wiggy Thump Records.

Content
The album includes the single "Die Rockin", which lead singer Cody Cannon wrote with Ray Wylie Hubbard. It is also the first album to be produced entirely by the band.

Whiskey Myers debuted at number one on the Top Country Albums chart published for October 12, 2019, with 39,000 units sold in its first week.

Commercial performance
Whiskey Myers debuted at No. 1 on Top Country Albums with  42,000 album equivalent units, 39,000 of which are in traditional album sales. The sales figure was boosted by a concert ticket/album tie-in offer for the band's 2019 tour. It has sold 47,900 copies in the United States as of March 2020.

Critical reception 
Writing for Nashville Lifestyles Magazine, music critic Luke Levenson praised the album, commenting, "In the case of Whiskey Myers, its creators returned to form, writing from the gut and playing from the heart. There's a noticeable touch of the band's rich music taste in the songs' production."

Track listing

Personnel

Whiskey Myers 
 Cody Cannon – lead vocals, rhythm guitar
 John Jeffers – guitars, lead vocals, backing vocals, art direction
 Cody Tate – guitars, backing vocals
 Jamey Gleaves – bass
 Jeff Hogg – drums
 Tony Kent – percussion

Additional musicians 
 Sean Giddings – organ 
 Eddie Long – lap steel guitar
 Bennett Brown – fiddle
 Kristen Rogers – backing vocals
 Tony Martinez – backing vocals
 The McCrary Sisters – backing vocals

Production 
 Whiskey Myers – producer
 Andrew Scheps – mixing
 Charles Godfrey – engineer
 Cody J. Simpson – assistant engineer
 Pete Lyman – mastering
 Zack Morris – photography
 Khris Poage – photography

Charts

Weekly charts

Year-end charts

References

2019 albums
Whiskey Myers albums